Rio Crespo is a municipality located in the Brazilian state of Rondônia. Its population was 3,804 (2020) and its area is 1,718 km².

References

Municipalities in Rondônia